Park Keon-woo (born 18 July 1991) is a South Korean road and track cyclist, who currently rides for UCI Continental team . At the 2012 Summer Olympics, he competed in the Men's team pursuit for the national team.

Major results
2022
 6th Overall Tour of Thailand

References

External links

South Korean male cyclists
Living people
Olympic cyclists of South Korea
Cyclists at the 2012 Summer Olympics
South Korean track cyclists
Asian Games medalists in cycling
Cyclists at the 2014 Asian Games
Medalists at the 2014 Asian Games
Asian Games silver medalists for South Korea
1991 births
20th-century South Korean people
21st-century South Korean people